Espen Knutsen (born January 12, 1972) is a Norwegian former professional ice hockey player and currently the general manager of Vålerenga in the Norwegian GET-ligaen. He played five seasons in the North American-based National Hockey League (NHL), and is to date the only Norwegian to have played in the NHL All-Star Game. In his native Norway, Knutsen is also known by the nickname "Shampoo" because his father is a hairdresser, and also a former hockey player whose nickname was "The Soap" (Såpa in Norwegian).

In 2021 he resigned from Vålerenga's board of directors.

Playing career

Early career
After being drafted by the Hartford Whalers in the 10th round (204th overall) in 1990, Knutsen remained in Europe until 1997, playing for his hometown team Vålerenga, and later Djurgården of the Swedish Elitserien. In 1996, the Mighty Ducks of Anaheim acquired his rights, and he made his debut with the Ducks in 1997. After a disappointing season (playing in part for the American Hockey League (AHL) Cincinnati Mighty Ducks), Knutsen returned to Djurgården. During the 1999–00 season, he was the highest paid player in the Elitserien, earning a salary of $280,000.

NHL career
Knutsen got a second chance in the NHL in 2000, when he signed with the Columbus Blue Jackets on the recommendation of assistant coach George Kingston, who had previously coached the Norwegian national team. In a very good first season, Knutsen tallied 53 points (11 goals, 42 assists) in 66 games. His numbers dropped a little the next season, but he was nonetheless named to the World Team (as an injury replacement) in the 2002 All-Star Game (making him the first Norwegian ever to play in the NHL All-Star Game). The 2002–03 and 2003–04 seasons were disappointing for Knutsen, who spent large parts of the seasons on the injured list. He left the NHL in early 2004, shortly after being assigned to Columbus' AHL affiliate, the Syracuse Crunch, and once again returned to Djurgården.

Retirement
Knutsen retired because of injury in July 2005. At the news of his retirement, the general manager of Djurgården, Tommy Engström, called him one of the greatest players in the history of the club. After his retirement, Knutsen moved back to his native Oslo, where he lives with his family. He was appointed head coach of his childhood club Vålerenga in 2006, a position he held until the summer of 2016 when he became the club's general manager.

Fan death

In a March 2002 game against the Calgary Flames in Nationwide Arena, Knutsen took a shot that deflected off Flames defenseman Derek Morris' stick and accidentally struck 13-year-old Brittanie Cecil in the head, which resulted in her death 48 hours later.
Knutsen later helped set up a charity in Columbus to honor Cecil's memory. Also as a result of the tragedy, the NHL made it mandatory to install protective nylon mesh nets above the glass behind both goals. In December 2010, Knutsen met with Cecil's family, bringing some closure to both parties.

Career statistics

Regular season and playoffs

International

References

External links

1972 births
Columbus Blue Jackets players
Djurgårdens IF Hockey players
Hartford Whalers draft picks
Ice hockey players at the 1994 Winter Olympics
Living people
Mighty Ducks of Anaheim players
National Hockey League All-Stars
Ice hockey people from Oslo
Vålerenga Ishockey players
Vålerenga Ishockey coaches
Cincinnati Mighty Ducks players
Syracuse Crunch players
Olympic ice hockey players of Norway
Norwegian ice hockey coaches
Norwegian ice hockey centres
Norwegian expatriate ice hockey people
Norwegian expatriate sportspeople in Sweden
Norwegian expatriate sportspeople in the United States